The  LAZ-699 is a LAZ-697 lengthened by one section, an upper-class coach, based on the city and suburban bus, LAZ-695. It was serially built from 1964 to 2002, in the Ukrainian city Lviv. In that time, a lot of prototypes were developed in addition to special luxury modifications and special vehicles for transporting astronauts on the Baikonur Cosmodrome. The serial production of the first modifications was modest. Only in 1985, when the production of the LAZ-697 was cancelled, were the free production capacities used for starting mass production of the LAZ-699.

History
In December 1961, the LAZ factory presented three new bus prototypes. The first was a LAZ-698, a one-and-a-half-storey modification of the middle-class coach LAZ-697. It got the nickname "Carpathian", which was given for LAZ models with high comfort. The second prototype was also a modification of the LAZ-697, lengthened by one window section (+ 1345 mm) and was named "Carpathian-2". It was intended to be used only on international and intercity routes, so the bus had an integrated toilette and a wardrobe in the rear section.

At the front, in the vicinity of the driver, a buffet with a thermos cell and refrigerator were installed. The stewardess seat was on the left side of the driver. The inner space was illuminated by luminescent lamps instead of standard incandescent lamps, and had 36 ergonomic and tilt-adjustable soft seats. Radio-connected earphones and lights were installed in the seatbacks. Moreover, every seat had an individual ashtray, a glass holder, a folding table and a net for storing papers or journals. Lateral and roof windows were covered by curtains. In summer, two roof hatches provided cool air flow in the inner space. Two heating systems warmed the interior: The first was an engine-dependent air heater, which absorbed the heat from the engine and delivered it into the inner space; the second was a vented heater that worked independently from the engine. The luggage space under the floor had a volume of 4,5 m3. Each person was allowed to take 20 kg of luggage with them.

Due to the lengthened construction, the body stiffness was increased. As a power unit, a 7-litres, eight-cylinder ZIL-375 and a manual, synchronized five-step gearbox, from YAMZ was used. The 180 HP engine was installed in the rear section and was sealed from the interior, so the inner space became soundproof. The cutting edge brake system had a pneumatic booster and a separated break drive. Pneumatic wheel suspension and power steering sufficiently simplified the drivers work at that time. Another special feature of that model was a second fuel tank, which made it possible to increase the travel duration without refueling. The bus reached a maximal speed of 97 kilometers per hour. The prototype was brought to Moscow in 1961, where it was shown to the public, including the then-leader of the Soviet Union, Nikita Khrushchev.

The third vehicle, created at the same time, was a further prototype, LAZ-699A "Carpathian" Prototype 2, which was a lengthened version of the LAZ-697, too. The intention was to increase the capacity, so in contrast to the other prototype, the wardrobe, toilette and the buffed were removed. Also, the ashtrays, the foldable tables and the glass holders disappeared from the seats. Both seats on each side were unified and simplified, so it was not possible to adjust the seatback anymore. In this way, the seat number increased from 36 to 41. Moreover, two additional tiltable seats could be installed at the front, in the vicinity of the driver, so the total number increased up to 43. The technically difficult pneumatic suspension was replaced by a leaf spring with a correction spring. For the experiment, the 5-step transmission YAMZ-200 was equipped with an electro-hydraulic gear shifting drive and a pneumatic clutch drive. Externally the only difference from the first prototype was the doubled front lights, which were installed vertically, on each side.

Between 1961 and 1962 two further modifications of both early mentioned prototypes were created, the LAZ-699 "Carpathian-2" and the simplified version, LAZ-699A "Carpathian". Both buses got 4 lights in the front. Compare to the first LAZ-699A prototype, the lights on these modifications were installed horizontally, in one line. They were contoured by a frame on each side. The lights had also a smaller diameter. The electro-hydraulic gear shifting drive was replaced by a mechanical system, again. The steering system was taken from the older ZiL-164 truck, which replaced the newly ZiL-130 power steering.  The buses got also the axle transmission from ZiL-164. One outer difference from the early prototypes were the bevelled rear wheel arches and the split direction indicator, like on the urban version LAZ-695.

It was intended to introduce that modification in serial production and the acceptance tests were carried out on the Crimean peninsula.  Unfortunately, the tests showed a lot of weaknesses. It turned out that the axles from ZiL-164 quickly failed. The body frame was also unreliable. Due to poor rigidity, the windows fell out. Another weak point was the power of the compressor that was insufficient for supplying the pneumatical suspension, which was installed on this prototype again.  The missing power steering made it hard to keep the bus under control, especially on dirt roads. The hydro-pneumatical breaks with pads drums. borrowed also from ZiL-164, were noticed as dangerous for operational use. Other problems were the leaky roof and engine compartment, which made the interior wet, hot and noisy and too high fuel consumption. Both buses failed the tests and were not accepted by the commission. Thus, the serial production was postponed until 1964, when all weaknesses, which were criticized, were completely eliminated.

In the meantime, in 1963, a further prototype, LAZ-699A "Carpathian-1" was released. In that modification, all the weaknesses of the proceeding prototypes were solved. The bus got more reliable axles from then new truck, MAZ-500. Externally the bus remained the same. It was the last modification with four headlights.

The fifth prototype can be seen as a pre-serial model. The design is similar to the first prototypes, with two headlights on the front and round wheel arches on both, front and rear axles.

Modifications

LAZ-699A "Tourist" (1964–1966)
In contrast to the prototypes, the serial LAZ-699A was significantly simplified. The toilette, wardrobe and buffed disappeared. The nickname was changed to "Tourist", same as on the LAZ-697. There were two serial roof types, a normal all-metal, with three ventilation hatches and a soft-top version, with three tarpaulin hatches, for use in warm or tropic areas. The body extension by one window section resulted in poor frame rigidity and the problem was not adequately resolved during the development of the prototypes, so the production continued only two years, until 1964 and there were produced only few buses of that modification.

LAZ-699A "Lux" (1967) 

Especially for the international bus contest 18e Semaine Internationale du Car and  XV Rallye Touristique international EUROPE-COTE D'AZUR, in Nice, France, which take place every two years, a luxury modification was produced in spring, 1967. The event lasted three weeks. In the first week, the latest achievements in the bus industry were presented. In the two remaining weeks a bus rally, along the French Riviera as well as through major European cities, took place. At that time, the contest had a huge prestige and the Soviet Union took part for the first time. Along with the LAZ-699 "Lux", there participated another cutting-edge bus model from LAZ, Ukraina 67, as well as models from other manufacturers, like ZiL-118 "Youth" and PAZ-665T. The buses, including the LAZ-699A "Lux", got a lot of winner prices from the French tourism commission.

The development of the model begun already in 1966. The aim was to create a modification of the serial LAZ-699A, with a higher comfortability and extraordinary design. The buffed at the front and the toilet with a wardrobe at the rear were installed again. The exterior remained the same, except for some lateral mouldings over the arches and metal hubcaps on all wheels. Also, fog lights and indicator lights were installed into the front bumper. The model was built only once. For the inner market, the bus was too luxury and for achieving such a building quality, it was too expensive. Also, in 1966, the preparation for the development of a fully new modification, LAZ-699N begun. The LAZ-699A became obsolete and the whole modification process of it was stopped.

LAZ-699N (1969–1978)
Although the serial production of the first LAZ-699A "Tourist" stopped in 1966, the development of an intercity bus, at the LAZ plant, continued. Already in the middle of the 60s, the direction of the bus design had been moving from round, borderless forms and bent roof slopes to clearly border and edged vehicle body parts. 

After the introduction of the N-modification of the LAZ-695 and LAZ-697, the new design was also transferred to the LAZ-699. The 699N-line got a reinforced front axle and power steering from the heavy-duty truck MAZ-500, rear axle from Raba and the modified engine, ZIL-375Ya5. The Raba axles have had a planetary transmission in the wheel hubs and a bigger area of the brake pads. Thanks to it, the braking distance decreased. A huge work was done to improve the brakes and to accelerate their reaction time. The breaks had a separate drive unit, so even when one of the pneumatic lines broke, safety braking was still ensured. The prototype, released in 1969, had the name LAZ-699N "Tourist-2". The front of the new body design became flatter. The rear section was unified with LAZ-695M. The disappearing of the bent roof slopes led to better body rigidity and bigger lateral windows could be installed. Also the problem with a hot inner space, due to the huge glazed area, was resolved with the new construction. A second novelty was the rear entry door, from that time on, a required attribute of LAZ-699. The seat quantity remained the same (41). But at the same time, the luggage compartment grew up to 4,38 m³. As suspension, a leaf spring was used on all axles. Before the serial production has started, there were produced three prototype series, which hardly differed. In 1973, the N-modification was sufficiently customized again. From that moment on, the nickname was changed to "Ukraina". The production lasted only two years. Between 1976 and 1978, there were built only few buses of that modification. One of the LAZ-699N "Ukraina" was restored in detail by enthusiasts from Kyiv

LAZ-699B (1969)

The LAZ-699B (Number-56E) was an attempt to create a high capacity city bus on an extended LAZ-695N base, similar to LAZ-699A that was lengthened by one section LAZ-697. The bus got also the powerful engine ZIL-375, with 180 hp, reinforced axles and body construction. The vehicle got also the automatically shifting gearbox, the same as on the experimental LAZ-695Zh and pneumatic spring suspension. The inner space had 31 seat places and could accommodate a total of 74 passengers.  In the middle of the construction, a wide 4-section flap door, from LiAZ-677, was installed. Thus the bus had three entry doors and an accumulation platform in the middle. It was built only in one exemplar by the All-union Experimental Construction Institute, in Lviv. In 1972, there was no need in such a bus type anymore, especially because there already existed the serial LiAZ-677 with a total capacity of 110 passengers.

Later, in 1972, that model was equipped with a hybrid propulsion system. There was installed the ZMZ-53 petrol engine, with a traction generator DK-512A, accumulators and traction motors DK-308A, with a power of 75 kW.  But it also remained an experiment.

LAZ Ukraina-71 (1971)

In the early 1970s, it became a tradition to bring out a luxury bus model with the newest technologies every two years and give them the name "Ukraina".  The LAZ "Ukraina-71" was the onliest, which was produced in two exemplars. The design was also not futuristic as on the predecessors, LAZ Ukraina-67 or LAZ Ukraina-69 and remembered the LAZ-699N prototypes. The interior was equipped with two televisions, radio systems, buffed, toilet, refrigerator, coffee machine and a gas stove.  Every seat, which could be tilted and moved sideways, had an individual lighting and ventilation system. The bus got a modified ZIL-375Ya5 engine, with still 375 hp, a hydraulic clutch booster, a two-section brake system and pneumatic telescopic suspension.

LAZ Ukraina-73 (1973)

Two years later, in 1973, a more comfortable version was produced. The floor of the passenger section was raised a little. Another new feature was an electrical-powered, automated two-section entry door, which opened outwards and a climate-control system. It was planned to install a newly diesel-powered engine, YAMZ-740, a prototype of the future engine for KAMAZ trucks but the LAZ factory did not get it. A new five-step transmission, YAMZ-204U, was used.

LAZ-699ND Prototype (1974)

In 1974, a prototype of the LAZ "Ukraina-71" was actually equipped with the diesel engine, YAMZ-740, with a power of 210 hp and was shown to the public at the anniversary exhibition "50 Years of Avtoprom", in Moscow. Later the bus had become the suffix ND and the production beginning was planned for 1979, but it never has happened.

LAZ-699P (1973–1974)

LAZ-699P based on the luxury LAZ-699N modification, "Ukraina-71" and "Ukraina-73". It had replaced the special version of the LAZ-695M for astronauts and was created just in time, for the cooperative space mission of the Soviet Union and the United States, Apollo–Soyuz. It was planned to start long-term missions to space stations, from the mid-70s. That had increased the sanitary and epidemiological demands. Another important reason was the increased demands on the protection of spacesuits, after the Soyuz 11 disaster. In 1973, the Bus Technology Research Institute at the LAZ plant had already existed, so the modification for the astronauts was completely developed here

The interior was hermetically sealed, the windows were double glassed and athermal Moreover, an air conditioning system, Freeturbo BM-15, from the German manufacturer Anton Kaiser, was installed. The bus was assigned to three compartments. The front one was destined for the driver and the commander. Passenger compartment number 1 lay behind the driver section and took about half the length of the bus. It was destined only for astronauts and the accompanied doctors. On the left side, three comfortable and extra big, rotatable astronauts seats were installed, specially matched for the future Soyuz-T spacecraft, with a three-man crew. On the right were three seats for the doctors. For the ventilation of the Sokol-K special ventilation units existed in that bus part. The passengers' compartment number two included nine comfortable seats, a toilet, buffed, refrigerator and a wardrobe. It was destined for accompanying personnel, who was banned for epidemiological reasons from contact with the astronauts. The rear door was in the middle section and led into a lock-chamber, where a vacuum cleaner sucked the dust off the spacesuits. The bus was equipped with an adjustable air suspension system. To protect the electronic devices of the interior, the engine electronic was shielded. Other minor features were:
radio receiver
сassette receiver
video cassette receiver
television system
internal communication system

The bus was solemnly handed over to the Soviet Air Forces, on May 16, 1974, in Lviv. It reached its destination by the military transport aeroplane, Antonov An-22. On July, 3rd, the bus was firstly used to transport the crew of a Soyuz 14 to their spacecraft. A second LAZ-699P was produced one year later, especially for the early mentioned Apollo–Soyuz space program. Between 1974 and 1975 the LAZ-699P brought the main crews to the rocket sites and between 1975 and 1991 the backup crews. Afterwards, the buses were replaced by newly LAZ-5255 "Carpathians", the successor of the LAZ-699. The second LAZ-699P was brought to the closed urban locality, Star City, where it burned down some years later. The first served at the Cosmodrome until 2003.

LAZ-699I (1974–1975)

Between 1974 and 1975, a further special version of the LAZ-699N was created for the Baikonur Cosmodrome. LAZ-699I was supposed to be a mobile service point, for supporting rocket launches. The bus was equipped with two separate cooling and onboard power supply systems. During the ride, a standard fluid cooling system worked. The power supply was provided by a 12V onboard network and a 1,2 kW power generator.  In stationary operation, the bus was heated and cooled by an electrical power system, consisted of 12 heater fans LN-1. For power supply of that system and the numerous energy consumers, like microphones, telecommunication devices and a powerful air conditioner "Anton Kaiser PVKE 25-0", an on-board electrical network, with a voltage of 380/220 V AC and frequency of 50 Hz, was used.
The bus was separated into three sections. Compartment number 1 lay at the back. On the left, three working places with microphones existed. Furthermore, 4 seats for 8 persons, an air conditioner remote control,  a refrigerator and a wardrobe were installed. The second section lay between the two main compartments and included one seat, a costume wardrobe and a vacuum cleaner cupboard.  The vacuum cleaner was used, to clean the costumes from dust. The third compartment lay behind the driver place. It also included 8 sitting places, a wardrobe and a big table. Every main compartment had an own entry door, which led into the hermetically sealed inner space, but in contrast to the LAZ-699P, the configuration of the door placement was similar to the serial LAZ-699N. Technically that modification was similar to the LAZ-699P. Altogether, 2 buses of that version were built, which served until 2003 on the Cosmodrome.

LAZ-699R (1978–2002)
The new modification replaced the LAZ-699N in 1978. But only in 1983, when the production of the middle-class coach LAZ-697 was shortened, the first mass production of the LAZ-699 had begun. In 1985, the LAZ-697 was fully replaced by the 699 model. In the over 20 years of production, that model has undergone numerous modifications but the main parts and the body design remained the same. The interior has still 41 seats with tiltable backs, individual lighting and a ventilation system. Until 1981, the buses had rectangular headlights. Also, the early models had a false radiator screen. That feature was removed at the end of the 80s. In the first half of the 80s, a luxury version for the service of various high government institutions existed. Typical for these models were decorative external parts, made of black plastic, like hubcaps and the false radiator screen and the air intake as well as a front bumper with frog lights. From 1990 the driver entry door disappeared from the buses.
Although originally designed for long-distance service, it was used on shorter intercity and suburban routes. The main reason was the obsolete construction, even at the beginning of the 80s. At that time more comfortable and economical, diesel-powered coaches existed in the Soviet Union, like the Hungarian Ikarus 256 and Ikarus 250. Nevertheless, the bus had also some advantages. Due to its simple and over the decades' proven construction, the bus was reliable and could pass hard dirt routes, which were typical for the Soviet Union.

After the Dissolution of the Soviet Union and the associated increase of fuel prices, petrol-powered engines ZIL-375, originally intended for the military all-wheel-drive truck, Ural-375, became obsolete. The bus operators began to customize the engines with gas systems or installed diesel engines, like the YAMZ-236 from the MAZ trucks. Compare to the original ZIL engine, the YAMZ-236 is half a tone heavier and, without a turbocharger, has nearly the same power of 195 hp. Nevertheless, the diesel engine has much better traction characteristic, like a higher torque of 716 Nm (ZIL-375: 475 Nm), which is reached at a much lower speed of 1400 rpm.  The fuel consumption of a LAZ with such an engine, decreased from 40 to 27 litres of cheaper diesel fuel. However, replacing the engine required also the installation of a suitable gearbox.
The research work by the manufacturer was made only on the LAZ-695 series. The choice firstly fell on the D-245.9, from Belarusian manufacturer MMZ. Later also the early mentioned YAMZ-236 was serially installed. There existed two different designations, the LAZ-695D "Dana" and LAZ-695T "Tanya". The LAZ-699 was serially equipped with the YAMZ-236A diesel engine, but did not get an own designation letter. By the way, no gas powered 699 modification, like the LAZ-695NG, with gas vessels on the roof, has never existed.

LAZ-699 "Carpathian" (1978)

The LAZ-699 "Carpathian" was produced in only one exemplar by the All-Union Experimental Bus Construction Institute, in Lviv. The modification was a completely new construction both, externally and internally. Some design elements and technical solutions were integrated into the serial LAZ-699R. After few presentations, the bus was passed to the astronaut training centre in Moscow, where it worked for many years. Afterwards, the model was developed further under the designation 5255P.

Comparison

References 

Vehicles introduced in 1960
Buses of the Soviet Union
Buses of Ukraine
Buses